Ragna Vilhelmine Nielsen (née Ullmann) (17 July 1845 – 29 September 1924) was a Norwegian pedagogue, school headmistress, publicist, organizer, politician and feminist.

Personal life
Ragna Nielsen was born in Christiania (now Oslo) to Jørgen Axel Nicolai Ullmann and his wife, pedagogist, publicist, literary critic and feminist Cathrine Johanne Fredrikke Vilhelmine Dunker. She married Ludvig Nielsen in 1879, and settled with her husband in Tromsø. The couple was separated in 1884, when she moved back to Kristiania. She was the sister of politician Viggo Ullmann.

Career
As a child Ragna attended her mother's school for girls, and then attended Hartvig Nissen's private school for girls until 1860. From 1862, she received an assignment at Nissen's school, where she taught until 1879. She was a teacher in Tromsø until 1884. She established the school  in Kristiania in 1885. It was started as a girls' school, but soon became a common school for both girls and boys. She was the first headmistress of a secondary school in Norway. She chaired the Norwegian Association for Women's Rights for two periods, from 1886 to 1888, and from 1889 to 1895. She founded or co-founded a number of organizations, including  in 1885,  in 1890,  in 1891, and Hjemmenes Vel in 1898. She was elected to the Kristiania City Council from 1901 to 1904. She co-founded the language organization Riksmålsforeningen in 1907, and chaired the organization from 1909 to 1910.

She co-founded the women's magazine  in 1921.

References

Norwegian women's rights activists
1845 births
1924 deaths
Schoolteachers from Oslo
Norwegian feminists
19th-century Norwegian educators
20th-century Norwegian politicians
20th-century Norwegian women politicians
20th-century Norwegian educators
Women school principals and headteachers
Norwegian Association for Women's Rights people
19th-century women educators
20th-century women educators
Politicians from Oslo